Shinichi Chan (born 5 September 2002) is a Japanese-born Hong Kong professional footballer who currently plays for Primera Federación club Real Unión, on loan from Hong Kong Premier League club Kitchee. He is also of partial Japanese descent.

Club career

Kitchee
Shinichi made his league debut at the young age of 16 on 16 February 2019 against Tai Po.

Shinichi scored his first Sapling Cup goal against Lee Man on 10 January 2020. He was announced as the man of the match for the last game.

Real Unión
On 20 January 2023, it was announced that Chan would join Real Unión on loan until June 2024.

On 21 January 2023, Chan made his debut for Real Unión B.

On 11 February 2023, Chan made his debut for Real Unión in Primera Federación. 

On 18 February 2023, in his second game for Real Unión, Chan scored his first goal for the club in a 1-0 win against CD Calahorra, making him the first player from Hong Kong to score in any level of Spanish football.

International career
Shinichi made his international debut against Chinese Taipei on 11 June 2019 at the age of only 16. He became the youngest player who has ever represented the national team.

In May 2021, Shinichi was selected for the Hong Kong squad for the 2022 FIFA World Cup qualification held in Bahrain.

Career statistics

Club

Notes

International

Honours

Club
Kitchee
 Hong Kong Premier League: 2019–20, 2020-21
 Hong Kong Senior Shield: 2018–19
 Hong Kong FA Cup: 2018–19
 Hong Kong Sapling Cup: 2019–20

References

External links
 
 Shinichi Chan at HKFA
 

Living people
2002 births
Hong Kong footballers
Hong Kong expatriate footballers
Hong Kong international footballers
Hong Kong people of Japanese descent
Association football midfielders
Association football defenders
Hong Kong First Division League players
Hong Kong Premier League players
Primera Federación players
Resources Capital FC players
Kitchee SC players
Real Unión footballers
Expatriate footballers in Spain